Charles Gonthier, Prince of Schwarzburg-Sondershausen (7 August 1830 – 28 March 1909) was the ruler of the principality of Schwarzburg-Sondershausen, a constituent state of the German Empire, and head of the House of Schwarzburg from 17 July 1880 until his death.

Hereditary Prince
Prince Charles Gonthier was born in Arnstadt, the third child of Hereditary Prince Gonthier Frederick Charles and his first wife, Princess Marie of Schwarzburg-Rudolstadt. The death of his elder brother Prince Gonthier in 1833 put Charles Gonthier in direct line for the throne. As such, upon the abdication of his grandfather, Prince Gonthier Frederick Charles I, on 19 August 1835, he became Hereditary Prince and heir apparent to his father, who became Prince Gonthier Frederick Charles II.   

In 1850 Prince Charles Gonthier enrolled at the University of Bonn to begin his studies in law and literature. Also in 1850, he embarked upon a career in the Prussian Army, being appointed an Oberleutnant. Two years later he was promoted to the rank of Rittmeister before once gaining promotion to the rank Major in 1855.

On 12 June 1869 Prince Charles Gonthier was married in Altenburg to Princess Marie Gasparine of Saxe-Altenburg, Duchess of Saxony, the daughter of Prince Eduard of Saxe-Altenburg.

Ruling prince
On 17 July 1880, following the abdication of his father due to an eye condition, Hereditary Prince Charles Gonthier succeeded him as ruling prince and head of the House of Schwarzburg. During his reign, he made advancements to the education system of the principality, opening a state school and teacher-training facility.

As the marriage of Prince Charles Gonthier was childless, the heir presumptive to the throne was his younger brother, Prince Leopold. In 1890 the two brothers caused a scandal in Germany when they came to blows after Prince Leopold, who desired to marry, took offence to his brother's suggestion that he marry a commoner if no royal woman would agree to marry him.

As his brother remained unmarried and Charles Gonthier childless, the Schwarzburg-Sondershausen branch of the House of Schwarzburg was on the verge of extinction, with no other princes remaining. The princely house of Schwarzburg consisted of two branches, Sondershausen being the senior line and Schwarzburg-Rudolstadt the junior. According to a family pact from 7 September 1713, upon the extinction of one of the branches, the principality would pass to the surviving one. However, as the Rudolstadt branch was also threatened with extinction on 21 April 1896, Prince Charles Gonthier agreed with the remaining dynasts, his brother Prince Leopold and cousin Prince Günther Victor of Schwarzburg-Rudolstadt, that their morganatic relative Prince Sizzo of Leutenberg was to become a member of the princely house with full succession rights. Their decision became law on 1 June 1896.  

In 1906 Prince Charles Gonthier suffered a serious injury in a hunting accident. He spent the remaining years of his life confined to a hospital bed and died in a sanatorium in Dresden. As his brother and heir Prince Leopold had died in 1906, Prince Charles Gonthier was succeeded by his cousin, Prince Günther Victor, in whom both Schwarzburg principalities became vested in a personal union.

Titles and honours

Titles
7 August 1830 - 19 August 1835: His Serene Highness Prince Charles Gonthier of Schwarzburg-Sondershausen
19 August 1835 - 17 July 1880: His Serene Highness the Hereditary Prince of Schwarzburg-Sondershausen
17 July 1880 - 28 March 1909: His Serene Highness the Prince of Schwarzburg-Sondershausen

Honours and awards
Colonel-in-Chief of the Third Regiment of Thuringian Infantry
  Ascanian duchies: Grand Cross of the Order of Albert the Bear, 2 August 1850
 : Knight of the Order of Saint Hubert, 1850
 : Grand Cross of the Order of the White Falcon, 20 July 1861
  Kingdom of Prussia:
 Knight of the Royal Order of the Crown, 1st Class, 14 June 1864
 Knight of the Order of the Red Eagle, 3rd Class with Swords, 1866; Grand Cross with Swords on Ring, 5 April 1875
 Member of Honour of the Johanniter Order, 1884; Knight of Honour, 24 September 1889
 Knight of the Order of the Black Eagle, 3 November 1892
 : Grand Cross of the House and Merit Order of Duke Peter Friedrich Ludwig, with Golden Crown, 9 June 1869
  Mecklenburg: Grand Cross of the House Order of the Wendish Crown, with Crown in Ore, 25 January 1882
 : Grand Cross of the Order of the Württemberg Crown, 1889

Ancestry

References 

1830 births
1909 deaths
House of Schwarzburg
People from Schwarzburg-Sondershausen
Generals of Infantry (Prussia)